Heliconius elevatus is a butterfly of the family Nymphalidae. It was described by Nöldner in 1901. It is found in the Amazon Basin. The habitat consists of riparian forests.

The larvae are gregarious and mostly feed on Passiflora species from the subgenus Granadilla. Full-grown larvae have a white body with black spots and an orange head. They reach a length of about 16 mm.

Subspecies
Heliconius elevatus elevatus (Peru)
Heliconius elevatus bari Oberthür, 1902 (French Guiana)
Heliconius elevatus lapis Lamas, 1976 (Peru)
Heliconius elevatus perchlora Joicey & Kaye, 1917 (Bolivia)
Heliconius elevatus pseudocupidineus Neustetter, 1931 (Peru)
Heliconius elevatus roraima Turner, 1966 (Guyana)
Heliconius elevatus schmidt-mummi Takahashi, 1977 (Brazil)
Heliconius elevatus schmassmanni Joicey & Talbot, 1925 (Brazil: Mato Grosso, Rondônia)
Heliconius elevatus sonjae Neukirchen, 1997 (Brazil: Pará)
Heliconius elevatus taracuanus Bryk, 1953 (Brazil: Amazonas)
Heliconius elevatus tumatumari Kaye, 1906 (Guyana)
Heliconius elevatus willmotti  Neukirchen, 1997 (Ecuador)
Heliconius elevatus zoelleri Neukirchen, 1990 (Venezuela)

References

 Heliconius elevatus in uniprot

elevatus
Nymphalidae of South America
Lepidoptera of Brazil
Lepidoptera of French Guiana
Lepidoptera of Venezuela
Fauna of the Amazon
Butterflies described in 1901